Redwood High School may refer to:

 Redwood High School (Larkspur), in Marin County, California, part of the Tamalpais Union High School District
 Redwood High School (Visalia), in Tulare County, California, part of the Visalia Unified School District
 Redwood High School in Redwood City, California, part of the Sequoia Union High School District
 Redwood Alternative High School, in Castro Valley, California